Édouard Léopold Cissé (born 30 March 1978) is a French former footballer who played as a midfielder.

Early life

Cissé was born in Pau, Pyrénées-Atlantiques in southwest France.

Club career
Cissé made his breakthrough at his boyhood club Pau FC in 1997.

Cissé previously played for AS Monaco FC in France and West Ham in the English Premiership (where he scored once against Charlton Athletic) and Paris Saint-Germain. On 28 June 2007, it was confirmed that Cissé had signed a two-year contract (with an option of a third) with Beşiktaş J.K. of Turkey for a fee of €1.5 million per annum. He played well with Fabian Ernst and left the club on 3 June 2009 to sign with Olympique de Marseille. On 18 August 2011, he joined AJ Auxerre on a two-year contract. After two years at the club he left in 2013.

International career
Cissé played for the France under-20 and under-21 teams. Having Senegalese ancestry, he became eligible to play for the Senegal national football team in 2009 after a change in FIFA regulations. He was called up to friendly match against South Korea, but rejected the call saying that he would rather clarify some points, having not been called up again.

Honours
Paris Saint-Germain
Coupe de la Ligue: 1997–98
UEFA Intertoto Cup: 2001
Coupe de France: 2005–06

Monaco
UEFA Champions League runner-up: 2003–04

Besiktas
Süper Lig: 2008–09
Turkish Cup: 2008–09

Marseille
Ligue 1: 2009–10
Coupe de la Ligue: 2009–10, 2010–11
Trophée des Champions: 2010, 2011

References

External links

Living people
1978 births
Sportspeople from Pau, Pyrénées-Atlantiques
French sportspeople of Senegalese descent
Association football midfielders
French footballers
Pau FC players
Paris Saint-Germain F.C. players
Stade Rennais F.C. players
AS Monaco FC players
West Ham United F.C. players
Beşiktaş J.K. footballers
Premier League players
Olympique de Marseille players
AJ Auxerre players
Expatriate footballers in Turkey
Süper Lig players
Ligue 1 players
French expatriate footballers
Expatriate footballers in England
Footballers from Nouvelle-Aquitaine